Johannes Daniel Dahm (*born 1969 at Cologne) is a German geographer, ecologist, activist, consultant and entrepreneur.

Daniel Dahm is pioneering a just and sustainable development within science, as entrepreneur as well as an activist. For many years, he held leading positions in scientific institutions of excellence, as well as in the steering committees of civil society organizations. As a multidisciplinary scientist, he works in the fields of sustainability and development research, ecological economics and ecological creation of values, future of work, plurality and diversity of life.

Questions concerning new and sustainable living and models of wealth, human-nature-relations, co-actions between diversity, life complexes and sustainable socio-economies taking centre stage in his work.

Daniel Dahms international reputation and acclaim are largely based on a work that followed in the footsteps of the 1955 Russell-Einstein Manifesto – the Potsdam Manifesto "We have to learn to think in a new way" and the Potsdam Denkschrift, carried by the Federation of German Scientists. In 2005 he composed them together with the quantum physicist Hans-Peter Dürr and the philosopher Rudolf Prinz zur Lippe.  Above that, he published more than 50 scientific articles and book contributions, his range of lectures and publications reaches from philosophy of science over economical and civil society development, ecological approaches, up to city development and diversity of life.

Biography 
The geographer Daniel Dahm earned his doctorate 2003 at the University of Cologne with his dissertation "Sustainable lifestyles – urban subsistence for higher quality of life" dealing with the interplay between sustainable lifestyles, non-monetary economies and civil society.

From 1997 until 2005 he was member of the Wuppertal Institute for Climate, Environment and Energy and worked closely together with the economist and former member of the German Council of Economic Experts Prof. Dr. Gerhard Scherhorn. As research leader at the Institute for Household- and Consumer Economics, University of Hohenheim he worked until 2004 on "urban subsistence as urban infrastructure" . Inter alia he lectured at the Institute for Social Anthropology / Martin Luther University of Halle-Wittenberg. 2006 to 2007 he was appointed as Research Fellow for Science in Innovation at the Natural History Museum London towards the interplay of diversity and plurality of life and its complexity. Later he became the scientific director of the research group Ethical-Ecological Rating at Goethe-University, and until 2018 Vice Director of the European Centre for Sustainability Research (ECS) at Zeppelin University, Friedrichshafen, Germany. Furthermore, he is senior fellow of the Institute for Advanced Sustainability Studies.
2000 he was awarded with the Schweisfurth Research Award for Ecological Economics by the Society for Ecological Economy (Vereinigung für Oekologische Oekonomie Germany).
2008 he was honoured as Fellow for responsible leadership of BMW Foundation Herbert Quandt.

Additionally, he is Senior Advisor of the World Future Council, Member of the German Association Club of Rome, Member of the Federation of German Scientists VDW, Ambassador of the Association for the Promotion of the Economy for the Common Good / (Gemeinwohloekonomie), and Member of the Scientific Committee of Consorzio Costellazione Apulia. In the exhibition sector, he holds since 2010 the Chair of the Jury at Internorga Trade Fair at Hamburg Messe und Congress HMC.
In 2019 he was one of the initial signatories of Scientists for Future, and since then member of their advisory board.

Above this, he is founder and Managing Director of United Sustainability Group, an investment and consultancy company emphasizing strategic impact investment for sustainable development.

Daniel Dahm (co-)founded several civil society organizations and enterprises and holds various positions in several non-profit-organizations.

2011 he was Co-founder and Chairman of the first international trade fair for sustainable consume goods “good-goods“ at Hamburg Messe und Congress HMC. 
2012 until 2015 he was Co-founder and Chairman of the advisory board of Ecostyle Trade fair for sustainable design at Messe Frankfurt Exhibition.
2011 till 2015 he was Member of the AK Financial Policy at the Advisory Board for Sustainable Development of the Federal State of Brandenburg.
2009 he was Co-founder of Desertec Foundation, an international endeavour to realize a worldwide energy transition by the utilization of renewable energies. 
2007 he was Co-founder of the internet platform for sustainable consume www.utopia.de and Curator of the Utopia-Foundation. 
Also 2007 he was Founding Member of the board of Eco-Social Forum Germany (ÖSF Deutschland).

Selected publications 
Dahm, D. (1999): Desertifikation in The Gambia. Wohlstandskriterien und Wirtschaftsstrategien im oekologischen Konflikt. Cologne.
Dahm, D. (2000): Westliche Werte in Afrika oder afrikanische Werte im Westen? In: Jenseits des Wachstums, Politische Oekologie Nr. 66, 2000. Munich.
Dahm, D. (2003): Zukunftsfaehige Lebensstile – Staedtische Subsistenz für mehr Lebensqualitaet. Cologne.
Dahm, D. (2004): Oekonomie der Zivilgesellschaft. Zukuenfte, Nr. 47, Summer 2004. Berlin.
Dahm, D., with Hans-Peter Dürr, zur Lippe, R. (2005): Potsdam Manifesto 2005 “We have to learn to think in a new way” & Potsdam Denkschrift 2005. Oekom. Munich.
Dahm, D. (2006): Zivile Keimzellen der Halbtagsgesellschaft – Potentiale Buergerschaftlicher Einrichtungen. In: Stahmer, C.; Hartard, S.; Schaffer, A. (2006): Die Halbtagsgesellschaft – Konkrete Utopie für eine zukunftsfaehige Gesellschaft. Nomos. Baden-Baden.
Dahm, D. with Hans-Peter Dürr, zur Lippe, R. (2007): Global Justice, Equality and World Domestic Policy – The Potsdam Manifesto. In: Global Marshall Plan Initiative (2007): Towards a World in Balance. Hamburg.
Dahm, D., with Gerhard Scherhorn (2008): Urbane Subsistenz. Die zweite Quelle des Wohlstands. Munich.
Dahm, D. (2008b): Towards the governance of local and global commons. Berlin.
Dahm, D. (2009): Towards Sustainable Business Cultures. BMW Foundation Herbert Quandt. Berlin.
Dahm, D. (2009b): Prinzipien einer ökologisch sozialen Marktwirtschaft. Basispapier zu einer zukunftsfähigen Wirtschaftsordnung. Berlin.
Dahm, D. (2010): Evolution von Digitalem Empowerment und virtuellen Netzwerken. Infrastrukturen einer zukunftsfáhigen Ökonomie. In: Burda, H. et al. (2010): 2020 - Gedanken zur Zukunft des Internets. Essen.
Dahm, D. with Bannas, S. (2011): The decline of the Fossil Age is the rise of distributive justice. In: International Development Policy Series. Graduate Institute of International Development Studies. Geneva. http://poldev.revues.org/835
Dahm, D.: (2015) Corporate Sustainable Restructuring CSR. Springer, München / Berlin.
Dahm, D. (2019): Benchmark Nachhaltigkeit: Sustainability Zeroline. Das Maß für eine zukunftsfaehige Oekonomie. Monographie. Transcript. Bielefeld.

References

External links 
BMW Foundation Fellow for Responsible Leadership
Utopia-Foundation
German Association of The Club of Rome
Wuppertal Institute for Climate, Environment and Energy
Amina-Foundation
i.r.i.s. e.V.
Ecosocial Forum Germany / Oekosoziales Forum Deutschland*Natural History Museum London
Martin-Luther University Halle-Wittenberg
 Actual informations and downloads towards Potsdam Manifesto and Potsdam Denkschrift (selected press review, criticism, commentaries and additions, list of signees).
Daniel Dahm at Scientific Commons
"Sustainable Lifestyles - Urban Subsistence for higher Life Quality"

1969 births
Living people
Ecological economists
Scientists from Cologne